Theta Kappa Psi Medical Fraternity, Incorporated, is a national professional medical fraternity. Currently, the Beta Phi chapter of Theta Kappa Psi in Galveston, Texas, is restructuring the fraternity from its independent chapter.

History

Founding of Kappa Psi
The Society of Kappa Psi was founded on May 30, 1879, at the Russell Military Academy, a prep school in New Haven, Connecticut. The founder was F. Harvey Smith. The second chapter was established at the Cheshire Military Academy in Cheshire, Connecticut on November 30, 1879. A third chapter was established at Hillhouse Academy in New Haven, Connecticut on October 7, 1894. All three prep school chapters had dissolved by the mid-1890s.

Reorganization, from prep to collegiate
Kappa Psi was reorganized on November 18, 1898, at the School of Medicine at the University of Maryland. Leaders of this reorganization effort, now with a collegiate focus, were: 

Several of the members involved in the reorganization had been involved with one of the prior three Kappa Psi chapters. The reorganized Kappa Psi Fraternity was a joint medical-pharmaceutical fraternity, in which chapters would be chartered in both medical and pharmacy schools and colleges.

Early mergers
The fraternity absorbed the Alpha chapter of Delta Omicron Alpha medical fraternity on November 17, 1917, a stable chapter of a struggling small national. It had been founded at the college of medicine at Tulane University in 1907.

The fraternity absorbed the small national Phi Delta medical fraternity on January 26, 1918, bringing eleven active chapters at the time of the merger. It had been founded at the Long Island Hospital Medical College in 1901. 

Phi Delta's chapter roll included:

Reorganization from Kappa Psi
At the 1924 Grand Council Convention of Kappa Psi, the decision was made to separate the fraternity into two separate entities: one fraternity for medicine and one fraternity for pharmacy. The split was effective on January 15, 1925. The pharmacy fraternity retained the Greek name Kappa Psi, and the medical fraternity became Theta Kappa Psi. Under their new names, the fraternities both maintain May 30, 1879, as their date of founding.

With the reorganization of the medical fraternity out of Kappa Psi in 1924, it was necessary to assume a new name and rewrite and adopt a new constitution, ritual, coat of arms, insignia, badge, and pledge button. The medical group assumed the name of Theta Kappa Psi Medical Fraternity, believing that the addition of the Greek letter Theta greatly enhanced its ritualistic significance. The new constitution bestowed the national president with the title of Grand Prytan, the national vice-president with the title of Grand Vice-Prytan, and the Grand Secretary and Treasurer with the title of Grand Recorder and Bursar. The name of the new medical fraternity journal was The Messenger. The badge and coat of arms were designed by Richard Bliss. The insignia and pledge button were designed by R.C. Williams.

When the division of the pharmacy and medical groups was declared effective, on January 15, 1925, Theta Kappa Psi Medical Fraternity began its fresh endeavors with 32 chapters. Four of these 32 chapters included both medical and pharmacy students. Nine of its 32 chapters were inactive. Within a short time, the revised Ritual and Constitution together with the necessary forms, records, and updated charters were issued to the chapters of Theta Kappa Psi.

Following the reorganization, the Fraternity needed to be reincorporated. Incorporation papers were filed for Theta Kappa Psi by Dr. M.I. Samuels, Delta chapter, Wilmington, Delaware; Dr. C. J. Harbordt, Epsilon chapter, Dover, Delaware; and W.O. Klienstuber, Beta Eta chapter, Wilmington, Delaware, on May 6, 1926. The incorporation was completed on May 7, 1926.

Initially, Theta Kappa Psi Medical Fraternity found progress to be very difficult since there were at least five strong national medical fraternities with which it had to compete. Also, many of the strong leaders of the old Kappa Psi Fraternity were associated with pharmacy schools. Their interest in the new pharmacy fraternity was a strong factor in the rapid development of Kappa Psi Pharmaceutical Fraternity.

The first officers of Theta Kappa Psi Medical Fraternity were:

 Ralph C. Williams, Grand Prytan
 Jabex H. Elliott, Grand Vice-Prytan
 A. Richard Bliss, Jr., Grand Recorder and Bursar
 Victor J. Anderson, Grand Registrar, and Editor
 Thomas Benton Sellers, Grand Counselor

Following the reorganization, the Delta chapter struggled. The chapter depended upon transfers from other schools instead of working for themselves. The chapter also lacked leadership. It was necessary to withdraw the charter in 1930.  Delta had furnished more Grand Officers than any other chapter and had always been the leader among chapters. This trend was to end abruptly.

The zenith of Theta Kappa Psi Medical Fraternity was in 1933. The national officers were Grand Prytan R.C. Williams; Grand Vice-Prytan J.H. Elliott; and Grand Recorder and Bursar A.G. Engelbach. Through their staunch leadership, the Fraternity was weathering the depression and had a peak strength of 35 collegiate and 25 graduate chapters. The year ended with the international convention in Atlantic City, New Jersey on December 27 through December 29, 1933. Following an exceptionally successful convention the delegates boarded their respective trains bound homeward, filled with enthusiasm for their Fraternity. Little did they realize that Theta Kappa Psi was destined never to reattain the heights it enjoyed in Atlantic City in 1933.

Between 1935 and 1940, Theta Kappa Psi lost eleven chapters. By 1940, the Fraternity had dropped to sixth place among national medical fraternities in the number of undergraduate chapters. The problems confronting Theta Kappa Psi were not unique, for two other national medical fraternities, Phi Alpha Sigma, and Alpha Mu Pi Omega disappeared during the period. When World War II ended in 1945, Theta Kappa Psi was composed of only twelve collegiate chapters.

In 1955, at long last, improvement came. The ever-present R.C. Williams chartered Mu Upsilon chapter in Miami, the first new collegiate chapter granted since 1944. Beta Epsilon chapter at Ohio State University was reactivated. The apparent rebirth of Theta Kappa Psi, however, was short-lived. By the fall of 1959, Theta Kappa Psi's chapter roll had dropped to six. Several frustrated national officers began negotiations with representatives of Phi Beta Pi Medical Fraternity for a merger.

Merger with Phi Beta Pi
In 1961, Theta Kappa Psi merged to become part of Phi Beta Pi Medical Fraternity. The last national convention of Theta Kappa Psi convened on March 11, 1961, at the McAllister Hotel in Miami, Florida. During the meeting, a motion was made to merge with Phi Beta Pi Medical Fraternity and the motion passed. Theta Kappa Psi Fraternity, as a distinct national entity, passed into history.

Theta Kappa Psi was officially invited to merge with Phi Beta Pi upon the condition that Theta Kappa Psi would surrender its name, rolls, and treasury to the national Phi Beta Pi office in Pittsburgh, Pennsylvania. Chapters would be allowed to add the prefix Theta to their chapter designation. These conditions were accepted. Both fraternities were allowed to maintain certain of their original identification features.

The two Texas chapters of Theta Kappa Psi—Beta Phi chapter in Galveston and Psi chapter in Dallas—could not accept the action. The thought of sacrificing the fraternity's name, history, and tradition was considered untenable to them. In the wake of this disgruntlement, the two Texas chapters and Gamma Tau chapter at the University of Manitoba wrote a new constitution and termed their seceding organization Theta Kappa Psi International Medical Fraternity. Legal action, however, threatened by Phi Beta Pi concerning the use of the name, caused no meetings [in support of the possible schism] to be held after 1962.

The surviving chapters of Theta Kappa Psi followed diverse courses. Beta Epsilon chapter at Ohio State University continued as an independent local fraternity until 1964 when poor finances caused it to fold. Psi chapter at University of Texas Southwestern Medical Center in Dallas pledged members up until 1968 as a local independent fraternity. Gamma Tau chapter at the University of Manitoba continued as an independent local fraternity until it became inactive in 1968. Beta Eta chapter at Jefferson Medical College in Philadelphia was an active chapter in Phi Beta Pi until 1966. At that time the chapter lost all formal structure when it allowed non-members to live in its fraternity house. 

In the 1960s Beta Phi chapter at the University of Texas Medical Branch, functioning as a local independent fraternity, emerged as the largest medical fraternity chapter in the nation with 130 members. The ritual, revised from the previous national initiation ceremony, was strictly followed. Gamma Kappa chapter at the Medical College of Georgia affiliated with Phi Beta Pi after the merger. This chapter was extremely successful in the 1960s building a new fraternity house in 1966. Although listed as a chapter of Phi Beta Pi, the group considered itself a member of Theta Kappa Psi.

In the spring of 1992, the merger of Phi Beta Pi and Theta Kappa Psi was dissolved. At the time of closing, there were nine active chapters in existence. Of the 59 chapters installed by Theta Kappa Psi, the Gamma Kappa chapter at the Medical College of Georgia was the last to remain active.

Chapters
Following is a list of Theta Kappa Psi chapters. Active chapters are indicated in bold. Inactive chapters are in italic.

See also

 Professional fraternities and sororities

Notes

References 

Defunct fraternities and sororities
Phi Beta Pi
Student organizations established in 1879
Former members of Professional Fraternity Association
1879 establishments in Connecticut
Professional medical fraternities and sororities in the United States